Communist symbolism represents a variety of themes, including revolution, the proletariat, the peasantry, agriculture, or international solidarity.

Communist states, parties, and movements use these symbols to advance and create solidarity within their cause. These symbols often appear in yellow on a red background. The flag of the Soviet Union incorporated a yellow-outlined red star and a yellow hammer and sickle on red. The flags of Transnistria, Vietnam, China, North Korea, Angola, and Mozambique would all incorporate similar symbolism under communist rule.

In Latvia, Indonesia, Ukraine and Lithuania, communist symbols are banned and displays in public for non-educational use are considered a criminal offense.

Hammer and sickle 

The hammer and sickle appears on the flags and of most communist parties around the world. Some parties have a modified version of the hammer and sickle as their symbol, most notably the Workers' Party of Korea which includes a hammer representing industrial workers, a hoe representing agricultural workers, and a brush (traditional writing-implement) representing the intelligentsia.

The hammer stands for the industrial working class and the sickle represents the agricultural workers, therefore together they represent the unity of the two groups.

The hammer and sickle were first used during the 1917 Russian Revolution, but it did not become the official symbol of the Russian Soviet Federative Socialist Republic until 1924. Since the Russian Revolution, the hammer and sickle have come to represent various communist parties and communist states.

Red star 

The red five-pointed star is a symbol of the ultimate triumph of the ideas of communism on the five (inhabited, excluding Antarctica) continents of the globe. It first appeared as a military symbol in Tsarist Russia. It was then called the “Mars star,” reminiscent of Mars, the ancient Roman god of war. On January 1, 1827, the law was signed that put a five-pointed star on the epaulets of officers and generals. In 1854, the star began to be used on shoulder straps. Later, the five-pointed star with a two-headed eagle inside it was used to mark military trains and carriages. In Soviet Russia, the five-pointed star symbolized the protection of peacetime labor by the Red Army (again, like in Ancient Rome, where Mars was also the protector of the agricultural workers). In 1918, the drawing of the badge for the soldiers of the Red Army in the form of a red star with a golden image of a plough and a hammer in the center was approved. The star symbolized protection, while the plough and the hammer were read as a union of workers and peasants. By the 1920s, the red star began to be used as an official symbol of the state, and finally, in 1924, it became part of the Soviet flag and the official emblem of the Soviet Union. 

In the succeeding years, the five-pointed red star came to be considered a symbol of communism as well as of broader socialism in general. It was widely used by anti-fascist resisting parties and underground socialist organizations in Europe leading up to and during World War II. During the war, the red star was prominently used as a symbol of the Red Army troops of the Soviet Union countering the invading forces of Nazi Germany and wiping them out of Eastern Europe, achieving absolute victory, and ending the war at the Battle of Berlin. Most states in the Eastern Bloc incorporated the red star into state symbols to signify their socialist nature.

Red flag 

The red flag is often seen in combination with other communist symbols and party names. The flag is used at various communist and socialist rallies like May Day. The flag, being a symbol of socialism itself, is also commonly associated with non-communist variants of socialism.

The red flag has had multiple meanings in history. It is associated with courage, sacrifice, blood and war in general, but it was first used as a flag of defiance. The red flag gained its modern association with communism in the 1871 French Revolution. After the October Revolution, the Soviet government adopted the red flag with a superimposed hammer and sickle as its national flag. Since the October Revolution, various socialist states and movements have used the red flag.

Red and black flag 

The red and black flag has been a symbol of general communist movements, though generally used by anarcho-communists. The flag was used as the symbol of the anarcho-syndicalists during the Spanish Civil War. The black represents anarchism and the red represents leftist and socialist ideals. Over time, the flag spilled into statist leftist movements, these movements include the Sandinistas and the 26th of July Movement, where the flags colors are not divided diagonally, but horizontally. As in the case of the Sandinistas, they adopted the flag due to the movement's anarchist roots.

Guerrillero Heroico

This famous photo captured by photographer Alberto Korda of Che Guevara in 1960 has become a world symbol of revolution. This image can be found on t-shirts, flags, hats, in street art, parodied in popular media, and even in the autonomous areas of Chiapas, Mexico, controlled by the EZLN.

The Internationale 

The Internationale is an anthem of the Communist movement. It is one of the most universally recognized songs in the world and has been translated into nearly every spoken language. Its original French refrain is C'est la lutte finale/Groupons-nous et demain/L'Internationale/Sera le genre humain (English: This is the final struggle/Let's group together and tomorrow/The International/Will be the human race). It is often sung with a raised fist salute.

The song has been used by communists all over the world since it was composed in the 19th century and adopted as the official anthem of the Second International. It later became the anthem of Soviet Russia in 1918 and of the Soviet Union in 1922. It was superseded as the Soviet Union anthem in 1944 with the adoption of the State Anthem of the Soviet Union, which placed more emphasis on patriotism. The song was also sung in defiance to Communist governments, such as in the German Democratic Republic in 1989 prior to reunification as well as in the People's Republic of China during the Tienanmen Square protests of the same year.

Plough or Starry Plough 

The original Starry Plough was designed by William H. Megahy, though the concept may have originated with George William Russell, for the Irish Citizen Army and showed silver stars on a green background. The flag depicts an asterism (an identified part) of the constellation Ursa Major, called The Plough (or "Starry Plough") in Ireland and Britain, the Big Dipper in North America, and various other names worldwide. Two of the Plough's seven stars point to Polaris, the North Star. James Connolly, co-founder of the Irish Citizen Army with Jack White and James Larkin, said the significance of the banner was that a free Ireland would control its own destiny from the plough to the stars. The sword as the plowshare is also a biblical reference in Isaiah 2:3-4. In the bible verse, God pushes his followers to turn their weapons into tools, turning the means for war into the means for peace. The marriage of Catholic tradition, the biblical reference being integral to the flag’s design, with socialist concepts, like the working class and the oppressor forcing them to take up their plowshares as arms, leaves the Starry Plough flag with complexity and nuanced implications, which culminate in a very wide range of interpretations.In China, the Plough flag, a red flag with white or yellow plough, is widely used in the period of the First Revolutionary Civil War as the flag of the Chinese peasant associations, an organization led by the Chinese Communist Party. It is believed that Peng Pai was the first user in 1923 at the peasants' association of Hailufeng. The Plough flag has many different versions and some are combined with the flag of Blue Sky, White Sun or Red Field; other are different on the details of the plough.

National emblems 

Many communist governments purposely diverged from the traditional forms of European heraldry in order to distance themselves from the monarchies that they usually replaced, with actual coats of arms being seen as symbols of the monarchs. Instead, they followed the pattern of the national emblems adopted in the late 1910s and early 1920s in Soviet Russia and the Soviet Union.

Other communist symbols 
While not necessarily communist in nature, the following graphic elements are often incorporated into the flags, seals and propaganda of communist countries and movements.
 Revolutionary music as well as protest music. The Internationale falls under this category.
 Socialist realism, an art style developed in the Soviet Union.
 Crossed proletarian implements, including picks, hoes, scythes and in the case of the Workers' Party of Korea a brush to represent the intelligentsia. The ubiquitous hammer and sickle also belongs in this category.
 Rising sun, exemplified on the state emblems of the Soviet Union, Turkmenistan, Croatia, Romania and PASOK.
 Cogwheels, exemplified on the emblems of Angola and China.
 Wreaths of wheat, cotton, corn or other crops, present on the emblems of almost every historical Communist-ruled state.
 Cherries resemblance from the Le Temps des cerises exemplified in the emblem of the Communist Party of Bohemia and Moravia.
 Rifle such as the AK-47 on the flag of Mozambique and Mosin–Nagant on Albanian lek.
 Red banners with yellow lettering, exemplified on the emblems of Vietnam and Soviet Union.
 Red or yellow stars, perhaps the most common communist symbol behind the hammer and sickle.
 Open books, exemplified on the state emblems of Mozambique and Angola; and also on the party emblems of Communist parties of Russia and Ukraine.
 Factories or industrial equipment, exemplified on the emblems of North Korea, Bosnia and Herzegovina, Democratic Kampuchea, emblem of CPUSA and Azerbaijan.
 Natural landscapes, exemplified on the emblems of Armenia, Macedonia, Romania, and Karelo-Finland.
 Torches, exemplified on the Emblem of Yugoslavia.
 Sword and shield, exemplified on the Soviet Committee for State Security emblem and the Mother Motherland.
 Cross and sickle, the symbols of the Christian communism and Christian socialism
 Portraits of various communist leaders, such as Vladimir Lenin, Joseph Stalin, Mao Zedong, Josip Broz Tito, etc.
Che Guevara's image,  in particular as it appears in Guerrillero Heroico (“Heroic Guerilla”), is a common symbol of the Cuban Revolution, Guevarism, and revolution in general.
 The Arm and hammer, exemplified in the logo of the Socialist Labor Party of America
 The animal Capybara has been adopted as a symbols of communism in leftist circles in Latin America.</ref>
Notable examples of communist states that use no overtly communist imagery on their flags, emblems or other graphic representations are Cuba and the former Polish People's Republic.

Gallery 
Examples of these symbols in use.

Hammer and sickle

Red star

Red and black flag

Plough

Other symbols

See also 

 Anarchist symbolism
 Bans on communist symbols
 Communist chic
 Hammer and sickle
 The Internationale
 Raised fist
 Red flag (politics) (🚩)
 Red star (★)
 Rose (symbolism)
 Socialist heraldry
 List of socialist songs

National
 Flag of East Germany
 Flags of the Soviet Republics
 Coat of Arms of the German Democratic Republic
 Coat of Arms of the Socialist Federal Republic of Yugoslavia
 Coats of Arms of the Soviet Republics
 Coats of arms of the Yugoslav Socialist Republics
 National Emblem of the People's Republic of China
 Soviet Union state motto

References

Bibliography 
 Arvidsson, Stefan (2017). Style and mythology of socialism: socialist idealism, 1871-1914. Routledge.
 Barisone, Silvia, Czech, Hans-Jörg & Doll, Nikola (2007). Kunst und Propaganda im Streit der Nationen 1930 - 1945: eine Ausstellung des Deutschen Historischen Museums Berlin in Zusammenarbeit mit The Wolfsonian-Florida International University. Dresden: Sandstein.
 Groys, Boris (2011 [1992]). The total art of Stalinism: avant-garde, aesthetic dictatorship, and beyond. Verso Books.
 King, David (2009). Red star over Russia: a visual history of the Soviet Union from 1917 to the death of Stalin : posters, photographs and graphics from the David King collection. London: Tate.

External links 
 "Blog: Heart in a Hearless World"

 
Red symbols